Song For is the debut album by American jazz saxophonist Joseph Jarman, recorded in 1966 and released on the Delmark label.

Background
Jarman's regular quintet with saxophonist Fred Anderson, trumpeter Billy Brimfield, bassist Charles Clark and drummer Thurman Barker was augmented for the record by another drummer, Steve McCall, and a new figure, pianist Christopher Gaddy, who had just returned from army service. Gaddy died on March 12, 1968, less than a month before his twenty-fifth birthday. Song For was his only recorded performance. Before joining Jarman, Anderson and Brimfield co-led a quartet which was one of the seminal AACM group.

Music
"Adam's Rib" is a Brimfield tune, while "Little Fox Run"" is an Anderson composition (the CD edition adds an unissued take of this piece). “Non-Cognitive Aspects of the City” is a work combining music with an extended poem by Jarman himself.

Reception

Scott Yanow, in his review for AllMusic claims "this music was the next step in jazz after the high-energy passions of the earlier wave of the avant-garde started to run out of fresh ideas".
The Penguin Guide to Jazz states about the album "Of great documentary and historical significance, though unlikely to effect any dramatic conversions."

Track listing
All compositions by Joseph Jarman except as indicated
"Little Fox Run" (Fred Anderson) - 7:05
"Non-Cognitive Aspects of the City" - 14:06
"Adam's Rib" (Billy Brimfield) - 5:57
"Song For" - 13:39

Bonus track on CD
"Little Fox Run (Unissued)" (Fred Anderson) - 10:50

Personnel
Joseph Jarman - alto sax, recitation
Bill Brimfield - trumpet (does not appear on track 2)
Fred Anderson - tenor sax (does not appear on track 2)
Christopher Gaddy - piano, marimba
Charles Clark - bass
Thurman Barker - drums
Steve McCall - drums (does not appear on tracks 2,5)

References

Delmark Records albums
Joseph Jarman albums
1967 debut albums
Albums produced by Bob Koester